David Archibald Harvey (March 20, 1845 –  May 24, 1916) was a member of the United States House of Representatives from Oklahoma Territory and the first person to represent Oklahoma at the federal level.

Early life
Harvey was born in Stewiacke, Nova Scotia, Canada, on March 20, 1845. He moved with his parents to Clermont County, Ohio, in 1852, and attended public schools in Point Isabel, a part of Washington Township.

Career
When the American Civil War broke out in 1861, Harvey joined the Union army and enlisted in Company B of the 4th Ohio Cavalry Regiment in September 1861. Harvey served throughout the Civil War.

Following the end of the war, Harvey attended Miami University in Oxford, Ohio, where he studied law. He was admitted to the Ohio bar in 1868 and commenced practice in Topeka, Kansas, in 1869. He served as Topeka's City Attorney from 1871 to 1881, and Judge of Probate from 1881 to 1889.

With the opening of Oklahoma Territory in 1889, Harvey moved to Wyandotte. He was elected as a Republican to represent Oklahoma Territory in the United States House of Representatives. He served in the Fifty-first and Fifty-second Congresses from November 4, 1890, to March 3, 1893. Harvey introduced the "Harvey Bill" in 1892 that called for Oklahoma statehood. The House Committee on Territories blocked the bill. He was unsuccessful in his candidacy for reelection in 1892 to the Fifty-third Congress.

After leaving Congress, he resumed practicing law, and represented the Indian tribes of northeast Oklahoma and the Cayugas in New York.  He resided in Miami, Oklahoma, and later lived on a farm that was part of the Wyandotte Nation in Oklahoma, near Seneca, Missouri on the Oklahoma-Missouri border, which had been given to him in consideration for representing their interests.

Death
Harvey traveled to Hope, New Mexico in 1916 in an effort to restore his health.  He died there on May 24, 1916 (age 71 years, 65 days). He is interred at Seneca Cemetery in Seneca, Missouri.

Family
In 1881 Harvey married Mary Crapsey of Cincinnati, Ohio.

References

External links

1845 births
1916 deaths
American people of Scotch-Irish descent
Pre-Confederation Canadian emigrants to the United States
Delegates to the United States House of Representatives from Oklahoma Territory
Kansas state court judges
Miami University alumni
People from Clermont County, Ohio
People from Colchester County
People from Miami, Oklahoma
Politicians from Topeka, Kansas
Union Army soldiers
Pre-statehood history of Oklahoma
Kansas Republicans
Oklahoma Republicans
Kansas lawyers
Oklahoma lawyers
Burials in Missouri
People from Ottawa County, Oklahoma
19th-century American politicians
People from Seneca, Missouri
19th-century American judges
19th-century American lawyers